Zool: Ninja of the Nth Dimension is a platform game written for the Amiga by Gremlin Graphics and published in 1992. It was marketed as a rival to Sega's Sonic the Hedgehog.  Zool was ported to other platforms and followed by Zool 2 in 1993.

Gameplay

The game is a platform game, relying on smooth, fast-moving gameplay. Its protagonist is Zool, a gremlin "Ninja of the Nth Dimension" who is forced to land on Earth; in order to gain ninja ranking, he has to pass seven lands, beating a boss at the end of each of them. The game contains a number of embedded minigames, including several arcade games, a scrolling space shooter and a game accessible only by making Zool play a certain tune on an in-game piano or finding certain invisible warp points.

Development and release
George Allan came with the idea of Zool as he was criticized on his previous game Switchblade II for having a lack of enemies. In development, Zool could cast spells to get him out of trouble by collecting potions. For example, Zool could escape from pits with high jump spells and cast a shadow spell to make a clone of him that follows his actions (thus doubling the fire power). In the final version, the spells were replaced with collectible power-ups. The very early name for the project was Pootz. The soundtrack by Patrick Phelan overlaps with the Lotus 3 soundtrack and inspired several modern electro/techno remixes. The game was heavily hyped upon its initial release, including being bundled with the then-newly launched Amiga 1200, although not the AGA version with enhanced graphics which followed later. In 2000, the Amiga version of Zool was re-released as part of The Best of Gremlin compilation.

Zool was also ported to the Atari ST, Game Boy, Mega Drive/Genesis, SNES, Master System, Game Gear, Amiga CD32, IBM PC Compatibles, and RISC OS, as well as an arcade machine. The Amiga CD32 version has original red book audio tracks by Neil Biggin and has the option to have both sound effects and music. This and the Acorn Archimedes port are the only two incarnations of the original Amiga version to have this. Most computer ports are close to the Amiga original but the Genesis and SNES ports both feature different levels which are structured differently, different background graphics, and unique bosses. The Sega Master System version features smaller, more scaled down stages and a more strict quota on collectible items, but also features unique gameplay moves like a wall climb. With the exception of the CD32 version, all console versions feature the soundtrack of the Amiga original, remixed appropriately for each console's unique sound systems.

Reception 

The original Amiga game was released to critical acclaim,
receiving scores of 97%, 96%, 95% from Amiga Computing, Amiga Action and Amiga Format respectively. Electronic Gaming Monthly claimed, "Zool sports great graphics, but ends up with a case of Super Trolland's disease: your character moves much too fast and with little control!" GamePro gave a positive review of the Game Gear version, praising its "great graphics and sound abound", as well as its "crisp" gameplay. Power Unlimited gave the Game Boy version 80% writing: "Even on the Game Boy the game is fast, but it doesn't add anything new to the well-known platforming genre." The same magazine gave the Sega Genesis version a score of 81% commenting: "Quite fun to play, with some pumping action here and there, but little new is offered."

Retrospectively, Virgin Media included Zool on their list of top ten video game ninja heroes. In 2011, Wirtualna Polska ranked it as the 22nd best game for the Amiga, noting its "absurdly" high difficulty.

Legacy
Two young adult novels based on the games, entitled Cool Zool and Zool Rules, were released in February 1995. They were written by Stan Nicholls and Ian Edginton and published by Boxtree. The Game Maker's Companion (APress, 2010), a book on hobbyist game development, contains step-by-step instructions on how to remake the original Zool game using GameMaker Studio.

Zool Redimensioned was announced and released in August 2021. It was developed by Sumo Digital Academy and published by publisher Secret Mode on the Steam platform. The game was based on the Mega Drive version, which was included as a bonus. Due to legal reasons, the Chupa Chups brand and logo that have been heavily featured in the Zool series as part of their sponsorship, featured in the opening title and the first level "Sweet World" have been removed due to the brand no longer being associated with the series.

Notes

References

External links

Zool: Ninja Of The Nth Dimension Amiga – HOL database

1992 video games
Acorn Archimedes games
Amiga games
Amiga 1200 games
Arcade video games
Atari ST games
Amiga CD32 games
DOS games
Game Boy games
GameTek games
Game Gear games
Gremlin Interactive games
Video games about ninja
Side-scrolling platform games
Single-player video games
Master System games
Sega Genesis games
Super Nintendo Entertainment System games
Video games scored by Patrick Phelan
Video games developed in the United Kingdom